Roy Evans (born 1948) is an English football player and manager (Liverpool FC).

Roy Evans may also refer to:

Roy Evans (actor) (born 1930), British actor
Roy Evans (Australian footballer) (1913–1987), Australian rules footballer for Footscray
Roy Evans (baseball) (1874–1915), baseball pitcher from 1897–1903
Roy Evans (EastEnders), fictional character on the BBC's EastEnders
Roy Evans (engineer), Welsh civil engineer and academic
Roy Evans (footballer, born 1943) (1943–1969), Welsh international soccer player who died in a car crash in 1969
Roy Evans (Neighbours), fictional character on the Australian soap opera Neighbours
Roy Evans (rugby league), rugby league footballer of the 1950s and 1960s for Great Britain, and Wigan
Roy Evans (table tennis) (1909–1998), Welsh table tennis player and official
Roy Evans (trade unionist) (1931–2015), Welsh trade union leader